John Hepworth (4 September 1921 – 24 January 1995) was an Australian author and journalist, best known for his "Outsight" column in Nation Review magazine, which he edited for several years.

Career

He was born in Pinjarra, Western Australia, and moved to Perth as a young boy. He attended Perth Modern School.

With the outbreak of World War II, he enlisted and served in South-west Asia, Ceylon (now Sri Lanka), and New Guinea.

He wrote the regular "Outsight" column for Nation Review and was its editor for several years, then contributed to Toorak Times, the eccentric weekly newspaper published by Jack Pacholli (1929-2004).

He also worked for the ABC, earning the attention of ASIO as a Communist sympathiser.

He died from lung cancer.

Family

He had a longterm relationship with writer Oriel Gray, with whom he had two sons, Peter and Nicholas. Peter Hepworth (1948 – 2011) had a successful career as a television screenwriter, including writing episodes for such serials as The Sullivans, The Flying Doctors, The Henderson Kids and Blue Heelers.

Bibliography
The Long Green Shore Pan Macmillan Australia (1995)  written for a Sydney Morning Herald literary contest
Lurie, Morris (ed) John Hepworth ... His Book (a collection of his "Outsight" articles, illustrated by Michael Leunig) Angus and Robertson 1978 
The Last of the Rainbow Yackandandah Playscripts (1963) 
The Multitude of Tigers (1990)
(with John Hindle) Boozing Out in Melbourne Town (1980)
Around the Bend (an account of a 1983 rafting trip he undertook with Hindle and Patrick Amer down the River Murray and filmed by an ABC camera crew)
Little Australian Library Dynamo House 
(with Michael Leunig) The Almanac of Unspeakable Colonial Acts Dynamo House (1986) 

For children:
(with Bob Ellis) Top Kid Puffin (1985)  based on Ellis's television drama
(with Bob Ellis) The Paper Boy Puffin (1985)  based on Ellis's television drama
(with Steve Spears) The Big Wish Puffin (1990)  based on Spears' television drama for Australian Children's Television Foundation

Sources
Wilde, William; H. Hooton, Joy and Andrews, Barry The Oxford Companion to Australian Literature Oxford University Press 1985

References 

Australian newspaper editors
People educated at Perth Modern School
Deaths from lung cancer
1921 births
1995 deaths
20th-century Australian journalists
Writers from Perth, Western Australia
Australian military personnel of World War II
Military personnel from Western Australia